Masahiro Yoshimura (28 October 1936 – 27 September 2003) is a Japanese swimmer and Olympic medalist. He participated at the 1956 Summer Olympics, winning a silver medal in 200 metre breaststroke.

Personal life
Yoshimura was born in Uwajima on 28 October 1936. He died on 27 September 2003.

References

External links
 

1936 births
2003 deaths
Olympic swimmers of Japan
Olympic silver medalists for Japan
Swimmers at the 1956 Summer Olympics
Japanese male breaststroke swimmers
Olympic silver medalists in swimming
Medalists at the 1956 Summer Olympics
20th-century Japanese people